Maynsky District  is an administrative and municipal district (raion), one of the twenty-one in Ulyanovsk Oblast, Russia. It is located in the central and northern parts of the oblast. Its administrative center is the urban locality (a work settlement) of Mayna. Population: 25,826 (2010 Census);  The population of Mayna accounts for 27.5% of the district's total population.

References

Notes

Sources

Districts of Ulyanovsk Oblast